Burundi participated at the 2017 Summer Universiade which was held in Taipei, Taiwan.

Burundi’s delegation consisted of only 2 competitors for the event competing in a single sporting event. Burundi did not claim any medals at the multi-sport event.

Participants

Judo

References 

Univ
Nations at the 2017 Summer Universiade